Baseball was introduced and only played at the 1981 World Games.

Medalists

Men

External links
World Games at Sports123 by Internet Archive

 
Sports at the World Games
World Games
World Games
World Games